Alexei Dmitrievich Pokotilov (1879–1904) was an Eser, terrorist, member of the Combat Organization of the Socialist Revolutionary Party, participants in the assassination of The Minister of Internal Affairs Vyacheslav von Plehve.

Biography
Alexei Pokotilov belonged to a noble family. His father was a major general.

He studied at the Kyiv University.

In 1901, he was deported under police supervision for 2 years due to participation in a demonstration near the Kazan Cathedral in Saint Petersburg. Pokotilov lived in Poltava, from where he managed to escape.

On the night of April 1, 1904, he died in an explosion at the  Northern Hotel, Saint Petersburg.

References

Socialist Revolutionary Party politicians